The Cherokee class of fleet tugboats, originally known as the Navajo class, were built for the United States Navy prior to the start of World War II. They represented a radical departure from previous ocean-going tug designs, and were far more capable of extended open ocean travel than their predecessors. They were also the first large surface vessels in the United States Navy to be equipped with Diesel-electric drive.

Navajo and Seminole joined the Pacific fleet in 1940, and Cherokee went to the Atlantic fleet. Navajo was en route to San Diego from Pearl Harbor on 7 December 1941, and immediately reversed course to Pearl Harbor once news broke of the Japanese attack. She became a critical element of salvage operations there, as did her sister ship Seminole, in the days following the attack.

Following the loss during World War II of the first two ships of the class, Navajo and Seminole, the class was renamed from its original pre-war name of Navajo class to Cherokee class, the name of the third ship laid in 1939, which still survived.

Ships

(*)Note: The reason for the gap in numbering from AT-95 to AT-153 is unknown.

See also
 
 Type V ship – Tugs
 List of auxiliaries of the United States Navy

References 

Auxiliary ship classes of the United States Navy
 
Auxiliary tugboat classes